Ghobeiry (also spelled Ghbayreh or Ghabariyeh) is a municipality in the Baabda District of Mount Lebanon Governorate, Lebanon. 

The inhabitants of Ghobeiry are predominantly Shia Muslims.

In May 1988, following three weeks of intense fighting between Amal and Hizbullah, Ghobeiry and Chiyah were the only districts of Beirut that Amal was able to retain control of, the rest of Southern Beirut coming under Hizbullah control.

Together with several neighboring towns and municipalities, including Haret Hreik, Ghobeiry makes up the southern suburb of  Beiruts, called Dahieh.

References

Populated places in Baabda District
Shia Muslim communities in Lebanon